The 1970 Ball State Cardinals football team was an American football team that represented Ball State University as an independent during the 1970 NCAA College Division football season. In its third and final season under head coach Wave Myers, the team compiled a 5–5 record. The team played its home games at Ball State Stadium in Muncie, Indiana.

Schedule

References

Ball State
Ball State Cardinals football seasons
Ball State Cardinals football